Wilhelm may refer to:

People and fictional characters
 William Charles John Pitcher, costume designer known professionally as "Wilhelm"
 Wilhelm (name), a list of people and fictional characters with the given name or surname

Other uses
 Mount Wilhelm, the highest mountain in Papua New Guinea
 Wilhelm Archipelago, Antarctica
 Wilhelm (crater), a lunar crater

See also
 Wilhelm scream, a stock sound effect
 SS Kaiser Wilhelm II, or USS Agamemnon, a German steam ship
 Wilhelmus, the Dutch national anthem